The 2013 Men's Australian Hockey League was the 23rd edition of the Australian Hockey League men's Field Hockey tournament. The tournament was held in the Victoria city of Melbourne.

The QLD Blades won the gold medal for the eighth time by defeating the VIC Vikings 3–1 in the final. NSW Waratahs won the bronze medal after defeating the Canberra Lakers 9–2 in the third place match.

Competition format
The tournament is divided into two pools, Pool A and Pool B, consisting of four teams in a round-robin format. Teams then progress into either Pool C, the medal round, or Pool D, the classification round. Teams carry over points from their previous match ups, and contest teams they are yet to play.

The top two teams in each of pools A and B then progress to Pool C. The top two teams in Pool C continue to contest the Final, while the bottom two teams of Pool C play in the Third and Fourth-place match.

The remaining bottom placing teams make up Pool D. The top two teams in Pool D play in the Fifth and Sixth-place match, while the bottom two teams of Pool C play in the Seventh and Eighth-place match.

Teams

  Canberra Lakers
  NSW Waratahs
  NT Stingers
  QLD Blades
  SA Hotshots
  Tassie Tigers
  VIC Vikings
  WA Thundersticks

Results

First round

Pool A

Pool B

Second round

Pool C (Medal Round)

Pool D (Classification Round)

Classification matches

Seventh and eighth place

Fifth and sixth place

Third and fourth place

Final

Awards

Statistics

Final standings

Goalscorers

External links

References

2013
2013 in Australian field hockey